Roger Derek Edward Pope (1934-2014), was a male rower who competed for England and Great Britain

Rowing career
He represented England and won a gold medal in the Coxless four at the 1958 British Empire and Commonwealth Games in Cardiff, on Lake Padarn. Also represented G.B. in the Cox'less fours at the European Championships in 1957 and 1958.

All four of the gold medal winning crew rowed for the National Provincial Bank Rowing Club.

References

1934 births
2014 deaths
English male rowers
Commonwealth Games medallists in rowing
Commonwealth Games gold medallists for England
Rowers at the 1958 British Empire and Commonwealth Games
Medallists at the 1958 British Empire and Commonwealth Games